The phrase women in business considers the historical exclusion of women in leadership roles, particularly in the field of commerce, business and entrepreneurship. Today, the phrase advocates for increased participation of women in the business, aiming to diversifying the workforce and those who contribute to the development of ideas. Compared to before, there is more equitable distribution of women in corporate leadership and entrepreneurship roles.

Increased participation of women in business is important for variation in business development, ideas and products. Participation also encourages the development of social networks and support that have positive repercussions for women and their social environment.

The state of women in business varies significantly around the world.  The number of women-owned businesses increased by nearly 3,000% since 1972 according to the "2018 State of Women-Owned Businesses Report" commissioned by American Express. Although society has made considerable advances to promote women in business , there is still a lack of career guidance, family commitment, sexual discrimination, lack of adequate capital, inadequate education and lack of access to, or training in the use of technology. Women are more constrained than men by their social and political environment.

The number of women as entrepreneurs is increasing in both developed and developing countries, and national governments are paying more and more attention to the practice.

Women in corporate leadership
Women make up only 6.2% of CEOs in S&P 500 companies, despite making up 47.00% of total employees.

As of 2016, women only account for only 20% of all S&P 500 directors despite making up 47% of the U.S. workforce and controlling about 75% of household spending and more than 50% of personal wealth in the U.S. There are around 2 women per board, with the average S&P 500 board consisting of 11 members. As of 2014, females make up only 14.6% percent of executive officers and 4.6% of fortune 500 CEOs. In 2015, women held 17.9% of the board seats on Fortune 1000 companies, showing the disproportionate gender representation on corporate boards of directors. While the number of women on Fortune 500 corporate boards continues to rise, the average rate of increase is only one-half of one percent per year. One in nine in the Fortune 500 list still doesn't have any women on their board.

As of 2014, nearly 60% of 22,000 global firms had no female board members, a little over half had no female C-suite executives, and less than 5% had a female CEO. However, there is substantial variation amongst different countries: Norway, Latvia, Bulgaria, and Slovenia had at least 20% female representation in senior executives and board members while Japan had only 2% female representation in board members and 2.5% female representation in C-suite executives.

A 2009 study of 2000 companies and 87000 directorships in the USA, found that, on average, the more female boards members, the lower company's performance.

Catalyst, a non-profit research organization, reported that having a higher percentage of women board directors was positively associated with companies' scores on four of six CSP (Corporate Social Performance) dimensions: environment, community, customers, and supply chain. Catalyst also found that there is a positive correlation between companies' board diversity and philanthropic giving. A recent report conducted by the Peterson Institute for International Economics has found that having more women in overall executive positions correlated to greater profitability at organizations: "Going from having no women in corporate leadership (the CEO, the board, and other C-suite positions) to a 30% female share is associated with a one-percentage-point increase in net margin — which translates to a 15% increase in profitability for a typical firm." 

Given the projected talent deficit that will follow the retirement of millions of so-called 'Baby Boomer' managers and executives over the next 20 years, women leaders may be seen by an increasing number of employers as an untapped source of talent, experience and senior-management leadership. However, a 2018 study shows that female CEOs are 45% more likely to be fired than their male counterparts, even if they are doing a good job.

A 2015 study of 400 female C-suite executives by Ernst & Young and ESPN found that there was a positive correlation between athletics and corporate success. Over 52% of c-suite executives played competitive sports, compared to 39% of women at lower management levels. Out of the executives included on Fortunes 2017 list of Most Powerful Women, 65% played competitive sports in high school, college or both.

Women as entrepreneurs
Female business people are the quickest developing kind of business person on the planet, and they have aroused the curiosity of numerous scholastics, especially in recent year. Female entrepreneurship ranges from just over 1.5 percent to 45.4 percent of the adult female population in the 59 economies included in the Global Entrepreneurship Monitor research project. Although entrepreneurial activity among women is highest in emerging economies (45.5 percent), the proportion of all women entrepreneurs varies considerably among the economies: from 16 percent in the Republic of Korea to 55 percent in Ghana–the only economy with more women than men entrepreneurs. A multi-year analysis shows that this gender gap has persisted across most economies for the past nine years (2002-2010). Moreover, in many emerging economies, women are now starting a business faster than men, making significant contributions to job creation and economic growth. Women are more likely to start businesses that focus on sustainability.

Developing countries
A disproportionate share of women-owned businesses in developing countries today are either small or medium enterprises, which often do not mature as a result of negative growth and poverty. Understanding the specific barriers women's businesses face and providing solutions to address them are necessary for countries to further leverage the economic power of women for growth and the attainment of development goals.

Nigeria 
Nigeria is currently the leading economy in Africa and holds much potential growth for female entrepreneurs. Women in leaderships roles do not significantly differ from males in Nigeria indicating there is significant growth potential once barriers to entry have been removed

Kazakhstan 
In some emerging countries like Kazakhstan the governments support the development of women-led SME's. For example, Kazakhstan in cooperation with EBRD executes Women in Business program. The budget of the program is $50 million. Empowerment of Women in the Corporate Sector is an international forum held in Astana, Kazakhstan. 44 percent of all businesses in Kazakhstan are Women-owned and contribute to Kazakhstan's economic development and modernization.

In order to support women and women's organizations with a view to sustainable and inclusive development, Kazakhstan held the OSCE-supported Second International Women's Forum on Future Energy: Women, Business, and the Global Economy in August 2017. The conference also focused on the importance of teaching women new technologies, as a form of social entrepreneurship.

Kenya 
Kenya has also seen significant growth for women in business - encouraging entrepreneurship by women has been an important approach to poverty in Kenya. The government, with support from NGO, has created many programs providing access to financial resources, loans, and entrepreneurial education. Two examples are the Women's Enterprise Fund enacted in 2007, and the creation of the Women's University of Science and Technology. The Women's Enterprise Fund allows women greater access to small loans and financial services, such as bank accounts. The Women's University of Science and Technology, which is the first all women's university in Kenya, allows women to access higher education and entrepreneurial training. These types of programs have empowered women to create small to medium-size enterprises, such as tailoring and bead-making. Kenyan society has also seen some shift in women's roles from caretakers to business owners, as called for in Vision 2030 - the Kenyan government's initiative to empower women, to achieve greater gender equality, economic growth, and to alleviate poverty.

However, more than 47% of Kenya's population is below the poverty line, especially women. Thus, the government should help women find more sources of capital such as financial resources and limited credit in order to increase the number of women becoming entrepreneurs.

These barriers that women face in the way of becoming entrepreneurs are exemplified through the perspectives of existing women entrepreneurs in Kenya. Mary Okello, the executive director of a cluster of private schools called Makini schools, discussed the difficulty of accessing loans. She explained that a major issue in Kenya was that only 1% of women-owned property which makes it difficult for women to offer collateral to the bank. Another obstacle for women in business is the limited foundational support from the Kenyan government. This is expressed through the experience of Esther Passaris, managing director of Adopt A Light. She recalled that when her organization partnered with the Council, there was no clear and evident framework for the next progressive steps and therefore felt that the government could have provided a more effective way of protecting her business.

Ghana 
In some other African countries, like Ghana, women such as Ayisha Fuseini have benefited from grants and sponsorships from NGOs and big business like Camfed and the Mastercard Foundation's Innovation Bursary Program (IBP) and became entrepreneurs in their own right.

Thailand

Despite it being considered a developing country, Thailand has been known to demonstrate decreasing rates of the gender gap in education. With one half of the population being women (In 2014, the population of Thai is 64,871,000 and the population of Thai women is 33,329,000), women play an important role in the country. "Thai women have a higher life expectancy of 78.0 years compared to men (71.9 years). In 2015, women comprised half of the 38.8 million individuals in the labor force; 17.6 million or 45.8 percent were women". Thailand has been known to not have any equal employment opportunity laws like some of the developed countries, they only have a provision in the Thai constitution that statesmen and women shall enjoy equal rights. Despite this Thailand is one of the countries with the highest number of women in management positions. It is known that Thai women were given the same opportunity to progress as men in the workplace. Thailand also has 45% more than the ASEAN countries and China of women in CEO positions, and 36% of woman senior managers, higher than the G7 countries (21%). Thailand also sits in a top place as one of the world's best-performing countries when it comes to women in senior business roles. The kingdom also has a high workforce participation rate for women rating at a high 60.1 percent in March 2019. They consistently stand in the top five Asia Pacific countries that have the highest number of women in executive roles. As the gender gap decreases more over time, women become more involved and hold an even greater place of importance in Thailand's economy.

Developed countries

United Kingdom 

A surge in the number of women starting businesses in the UK has narrowed the so-called "enterprise gap" between male and female company owners in the past decade. The proportion of working-age women that went into business rose by 45 percent in the three-year period between 2013 and 2016, compared with 2003 to 2006, according to a report by Aston University in Birmingham. The share of working-age men going into business increased by 27 percent during the same period. Reference: Financial Times

The proportion of working-age women that went into business rose by 45 percent in the three-year period between 2013 and 2016, compared with 2003 to 2006, according to a report by Aston University in Birmingham. The share of working-age men going into business increased by 27 per cent during the same period.

United States

The number of women-owned businesses in the United States is growing at twice the rate of all firms. As of 2018, around 40% of US firms are majority-owned by women. Corporate support for women in business is also on the rise, with grants made available to help women reach their full economical potential.

Affirmative action has been credited with "bringing a generation of women into business ownership" in the United States, following the 1988 Women's Business Ownership Act and subsequent measures. Progress has been much slower in most other developed countries. For example, in the United Kingdom, it is estimated that about 15% of firms are majority-owned by women.

 Black-American Women in business 
 Most of the African-Americans in business were men, however, women played a major role, especially in the area of beauty. Beauty standards differed between white and black people, and the black community developed its own standards, with an emphasis on hair care. Beauticians could work out of their own homes, and did not need storefronts. As a result, black beauticians were numerous in the rural South, despite the absence of cities and towns. They pioneered the use of cosmetics, at a time when rural white women in the South avoided them. As Blain Roberts has shown, beauticians offered their clients a space to feel pampered and beautiful in the context of their own community because, "Inside black beauty shops, rituals of beautification converged with rituals of socialization." Beauty contests emerged in the 1920s, and in the white community, they were linked to agricultural county fairs. By contrast, in the black community, beauty contests were developed out of the homecoming ceremonies of their high schools and colleges.  The most famous entrepreneur was Madame C.J. Walker (1867-1919); she built a national franchise business called Madame C.J. Walker Manufacturing Company based on her invention of the first successful hair straightening process.

See also
:Category:Businesswomen
Gender roles
Gender representation on corporate boards of directors

References

Further reading
 Roger E. Axtell, Tami Briggs, Margaret Corcoran, and Mary Beth Lamb, Do's and Taboos Around the World for Women in Business
 Douglas Branson,  No Seat at the Table: How Corporate Governance and Law Keep Women Out of the Boardroom
 Christ, M. H. 2016. Women in internal audit: Perspectives from around the world. Altamonte Springs, FL: The IIA Research Foundation 2016. 
 Hine, Darlene Clark. Facts on File Encyclopedia of Black Women in America: Business and Professions (1997)
 Krismann, Carol. Encyclopedia of American Women in Business From Colonial Times to the Present (2004)
 Lin Coughlin, Ellen Wingard, and Keith Hollihan, Enlightened Power: How Women are Transforming the Practice of Leadership
 Harvard Business School Press, editors, Harvard Business Review on Women in Business
 National Women's Business Council, African American Women-owned Businesses (2012)
 National Women's Business Council, Women in Business: 2007-2010 (2012)
 Deborah Rhode, The Difference ""Difference"" Makes: Women and Leadership (2002)
 Judy B. Rosener, America's Competitive Secret: Women Managers
 Robert E. Seiler, Women in the Accounting Profession (1986)

External links
Small Business Admin